Tapa (Тапа) is a tables game played in Bulgaria and North Macedonia. It is also played in Greece, where it is known as Plakoto. The word tapa means bottle cap.

Tapa is usually played as the third game in a Tabla match, the first two being Tabla (similar to common backgammon) and Gjul Bara. These 3 games are played consecutively in a match of 5. All 3 games are played on a standard tables board. (Note that there might be slight differences in the match rules and scoring; the ones described here are common for North Macedonia).

Tapa is also played in Syria where it's known as Mahbousseh ( Arabic: محبوسة ).

Rules

Each player starts with all fifteen piece pieces (or 'men') on the 24-point. It is usual, but not necessary, to place only 2 pieces at the start and add the others as the game develops. Since Tapa is not played as a single game, the winner of the previous game (Gjul Bara) in the match has the first turn.

Goal
It is a game of contrary movement i.e. the pieces move around in opposing directions. The goal is to bring all pieces to the home board (points 1 to 6) and then bear them off. The one who bears off all 15 pieces first wins the game.

Movement

After rolling the dice a player must, if possible, move pieces the number of points showing on each die. The number on each die constitutes a separate move. For example, if a player roll 5 and 6, they can move one piece 5 points and another 6 points, but they can also move a single piece 11 points (5+6), given that they have a free point (not blocked by the opponent) to land on in between, after moving the piece for 5 or 6 points.

If a player rolls two of the same number (a doublet) he must play each die twice. For example, upon rolling a 5 and a 5, he must play four pieces forward five spaces each. As before, a piece may be moved multiple times as long as the moves are distinct.

Pinning

Unlike many tables games, there is no hitting in Tapa. Instead, if a player lands on a point occupied by a single opponent's piece, he places the piece on top of the opponent's and traps it. A trapped (pinned) piece may not be moved. Pinning a piece already used for pinning is not allowed. Two of your pieces on a point, or one of your pieces used for pinning an opponent's piece, create an anchor, a blocked point on which the opponent cannot land or touch down.

Pinning an opponent's piece in a player's home board is a great advantage. The pinning player is unlikely to release it until ready to bear off. The lower the point number of a pinned piece, the greater the advantage. If a player pins an opponent's piece on the 1-point and doesn't have any of pieces on the 24-point, that player automatically wins the game and scores 2 match points (mars).

Bearing off

A player who has moved all 15 pieces to the home board may begin bearing off by taking the pieces outside the board. A player can bear off pieces from points that correspond to the numbers on the rolled dice. A player with no pieces on these points but pieces on higher points must play the move. A player who has no pieces on the points indicated by the dice nor on higher points, bears off from the highest point that has a piece.

A player with a pinned piece on the home board may not bear it off until it is freed. A player who has no pieces on the rolled points and a pinned piece on a higher point has to pass.

Scoring

The player that manages to bear off all pieces first wins and scores 1 point in the match. If the opponent has yet to bear off any pieces, then the winner scores 2 match points; this is called a mars.

Backgammon comparison 
Tapa differs significantly from Backgammon in several ways:
 It is a pinning game. There is no hitting or hit and run.
 There is no triple game or backgammon equivalent 
 There is no doubling cube either, so a player cannot win more than 2 match points in a single game.
 The player to go first re-rolls the dice; thus starting with a doublet is possible.

Basic strategies

Generally, there are two basic strategies.

Defensive strategy

This includes building anchors near the starting points and carefully progressing toward your home board, not allowing to be pinned. At the same time, a player should wait for a good opportunity to pin the opponent's pieces as close to your home board as possible.

Offensive strategy

At the very start, a player move pieces as far as possible, even leaving single pieces in the area of 10-point to 15-point. With this, a player open up a possibility to pin the opponent's pieces in their home board or very near it, before the opponent gets a chance to build anchors. This strategy involves a certain amount of risk since the opponent gets higher chances to pin a player's pieces and make faster progress in building anchors closer to his home board.

Some players prefer one strategy over the other, but this is viewed as a mistake by some people: What strategy a player use should be determined by the first few rolls. If a player roll smaller numbers at the start, then they should use a defensive strategy. On the contrary, if a player roll high numbers, they should try placing a piece around the middle-points. In the next few rolls, they should try to either pin an opponent's piece or make an anchor with a second piece.

The match

Tapa is seldom played as a stand-alone game. Together with two other games, Tabla and Gjul Bara it is played in a match of 5 or as long as one of the players gain seven points. A common name in North Macedonia and Bulgaria for all three games within a match is Tabla, the same as the first game. The first game is referred to as права (straight [Tabla]) when a need for disambiguation arises.

When starting the match, each player rolls one die, to determine who will start. If it's a tie, the players roll again. But, unlike the regular backgammon, the already-rolled dice are disregarded and the player that won the first turn rolls both dice to begin. In the next game in the match, the player that won the previous has the first turn.

References

External links

Mark Damish's page
Backgammon Galore

Tables games